Grapevine virus E (GVE) is a plant virus species in the genus Vitivirus.

See also 
 List of viruses

References

External links 
 ICTV Virus Taxonomy 2009
 UniProt Taxonomy

Betaflexiviridae
Viral grape diseases